Drăghici may refer to:

Drăghici, a village in Mihăești Commune, Argeș County, Romania
Drăghici (Râul Târgului), a tributary of the Râul Târgului in Argeș County, Romania
Drăghici, a tributary of the Slănic in Buzău County, Romania

People with the surname
Alexandru Drăghici (1913–1993), Romanian communist activist and politician
Damian Drăghici (born 1970), Romanian musician
Sorin Draghici (born 1965), Romanian-American scientist

See also
Dragić

Romanian-language surnames